Tentaspina sinister is a moth of the family Erebidae first described by Michael Fibiger in 2011. It is found in Indonesia (it was described from north-eastern Sumatra).

The wingspan is 8.5–9 mm. The forewings are light brown, with a dark brown upper medial area and part of subterminal area. The terminal area and fringes are light brown. There are small black dots on the costa subapically. The crosslines are brown and the terminal line is only indicated by black interveinal dots. The hindwings are grey with an indistinct discal spot. The underside of the forewings is unicolorous brown and the underside of the hindwings is grey with a discal spot.

References

Micronoctuini
Moths described in 2011
Taxa named by Michael Fibiger